Union Township is one of sixteen townships in Cerro Gordo County, Iowa, USA.  As of the 2000 census, its population was 185.

Geography

References

External links
 US-Counties.com
 City-Data.com

Townships in Cerro Gordo County, Iowa
Mason City, Iowa micropolitan area
Townships in Iowa